Olubadan (Yoruba: Lord of Ibadan) is the royal title of the king of Ibadanland in Nigeria.  Ibadan was founded in the 16th century, but the present Yoruba people only took control around 1820.  By 1850 they had established their unusual succession principle, which is quite different compared with other traditional Yoruba rulers in that it alternates between two lines. It usually takes decades to groom an Olubadan for the stool through stages of chieftaincy promotion, thus meaning that just about any male born title-holder of the metropolitan centre is a potential king.

History

According to the outline history of Ibadan by Oba Isaac Akinyele, Ibadan was founded in the 16th century.  Around 1820, an army of Egba, Ijebu, Ife and Oyo people won the town during their wars with the Fulanis. After a struggle between the victors, the Oyo gained control in 1829. A system where the Baale line (civic) and Balogun Isoriki line (military) shared power was established by 1851, subject to a traditional council representing both lines.

In 1885 C.E. the Royal Niger Company became effective rulers of the area, signing treaties with local powers such as the Olubadan, and in 1900 the British government formally assumed authority over Nigeria as a "Protectorate". The British created the Ibadan Town Council in 1897, using the traditionally powerful local chiefs to administer their town. In 1901 the Governor Sir William MacGregor introduced an ordinance whereby the Baale became the president of the Council while the Resident was only to advise when necessary (Rulers of Ibadan were generally referred to as Baale until 1936, when the title of Olubadan was resuscitated).

On 1 October 1960, Nigeria gained its independence from the United Kingdom.

Ruling lines

There are two ruling lines to the throne of Olubadan, Egbe Agba (civil) and Balogun (military), from where Olubadans are appointed on rotational basis to occupy the stool on the death of a monarch. The next to Olubadan and most senior on both lines are the Otun Olubadan and Balogun, who under the Western Nigeria Law are recognised as second class traditional rulers and who are included on the Nigerian equivalent of a civil list as a result. Others are the Osi Olubadan, Asipa Olubadan, Ekerin and Ekarun, as well as Otun Balogun, Osi Balogun, Asipa Balogun, Ekerin and Ekarun Balogun, while the Seriki ("commerce minister" or "trade chief") and Iyalode, (i.e. mother of the town as "minister for women affairs" or "female chief") are also members of the Olubadan's privy council.

The eleven high chiefs that formed the Olubadan-in-council, apart from the Seriki and Iyalode, are recognised as the traditional head of each of the eleven LGs in Ibadanland. It was learned that the progenitors of Ibadan frowned on the involvement of the senior chiefs in partisan politics because of the salient neutral roles they were expected to play in their domains. For instance, they are appointed as presidents of customary courts, who are expected to adjudicate on matrimonial, land, boundary and other communal disputes.

Ascension process

The Olubadan has the sweeping powers to depose or peg a chief, irrespective of the person's position on the chieftaincy line.  By implication, high chiefs on the lower cadre could be promoted above a high chief whose position was pegged. Even when forgiven, in the event that he was penitent, the promotion would not be reversed while the offending high chief served his punishment.  For instance, during the reign of Oba Fijabi II, between 1948 and 1952, a wealthy Balogun, who was next to Olubadan, was said to have had his chieftaincy pegged. About the same time, a holder of the title of Osi-Olubadan was also hammered for acts of disloyalty to the cause of Ibadanland, an offence regarded as treasonable felony. Spirited efforts made by a former Minister in the old Western Region to seek redress from the government and the courts when his chieftaincy title was also pegged, was reported to have failed. Although he was said to have been forgiven after seeking help outside the courts, his juniors who had been promoted above him were said to have remained his seniors thereafter.

In 1983, the late Olubadan, Oba Yesufu Asanike, withdrew the honorary title of Are Alasa from the then Governor of the old Oyo State, the late Chief Bola Ige, for an act considered as being disrespectful to Ibadanland.

Today

Oba Ogundipe, the 39th Olubadan, ascended the throne on 7 May 1999 and died in 2007 at the age of 87. He was succeeded by Oba Samuel Odulana, Odugade I who died on Tuesday 19 January 2016 aged 101.  Although the role is now largely symbolic, the Olubadan is still an influential figure and is not hesitant to attack local political leaders on issues such as violence, corruption and lack of true democracy in the region.

List
 Ba'ale Maye Okunade 
 Ba'ale Oluyedun
 Ba'ale Lakanle
 Bashorun Oluyole 
 Ba'ale Oderinlo 
 Ba'ale Oyeshile Olugbode 
 Ba'ale Ibikunle*
 Bashorun Ogunmola 
 Ba'ale Akere I 
 Ba'ale Orowusi 
 Aare Ona Kakanfo Obadoke Latosa 
 Ba'ale Ajayi Osungbekun 
 Ba'ale Fijabi l
 Ba'ale Oshuntoki 
 Basorun Fajimi 
 Ba'ale Mosaderin 
 Ba'ale Dada Opadere 
 Ba'ale Sunmonu Apampa 
 Ba'ale Akintayo Awanibaku Elenpe 
 Ba'ale Irefin 
 Ba'ale Shittu Latosa (son of Aare Latosa )
 Ba'ale Oyewole Foko 1925–1929
 Olubadan Okunola Abass 1930–1946
 Olubadan Akere I 1946
 Olubadan Oyetunde I 1946
 Olubadan Akintunde Bioku 1947–1948
 Olubadan Fijabi II 1948–1952
 Olubadan Alli Iwo 1952
 Olubadan Apete 1952–1955
 Oba Sir Isaac Babalola Akinyele 1955–1964
 Oba Yesufu Kobiowu July 1964 – December 1964
 Oba Salawu Akanni Aminu 1965–1971
 Oba Shittu Akintola Oyetunde II 1971–1976
 Oba Gbadamosi Akanbi Adebimpe 1976–1977
 Oba Daniel 'Tayo Akinbiyi 1977–1982
 Oba Yesufu Oloyede Asanike I 1982–1994
 Oba Emmanuel Adegboyega Operinde I 1994–1999
 Oba Yunusa Ogundipe Arapasowu I 1999–2007
 Oba Samuel Odulana Odugade I    2007–2016
 Oba Saliu Akanmu Adetunji  2016–2022
 Oba Lekan Balogun since 2022

See also
Nigerian traditional rulers
 Timeline of Ibadan
OYEBODE BUSAYO 2022-20700

References

Royal titles
Yoruba history
Nigerian traditional rulers
Yoruba royal titles
History of Ibadan
ABOBAKU 1
AKINBUSOLA BABATUNDE